Don Hillsman II is a professional penciller and inker. He has worked for comic book companies such as DC Comics, Marvel Comics, CrossGen, Dark Horse Comics, Caliber Comics and others.

Bibliography

Comics
 X-Men
 Demon Storm
 Spawn pinups
 Decimation
 Edge 1–6,8–9, 11–12
 Gambit: Hath No Fury
 Gambit: House of Cards
 House Of M: Fantastic 4 and Iron Man
 New X-Men: Academy X 3: X-Posed
 Scion 1: Conflict of Conscience Scion 2: Blood for BloodBooks
 Horrors of the Wasted West (Deadlands: Hell on Earth) (2002) Pinnacle Entertainment Group—Interior Artist
 Way of the Dead, The (Deadlands: The Weird West) (2002) Pinnacle Entertainment Group—Cover Artist
 Marshal's Handbook'', Revised Ed. (Deadlands: The Weird West) (2001) Pinnacle Entertainment Group—Interior Artist

Skateboarding
Don Hillsman II is also a professional Skateboarder who was sponsored by Converse and a few more companies and has gone to several countries for skate contests in the late 1980s and early-mid 1990s.

References

External links
 CROSSGEN Comics, The Don Hillsman Interview, January 2000
 Scifi Dimensions, Interview: Don Hillsman II, John C. Snider
 [www.dh2proworks.blogspot.com Updates on Hillsman's work on "Planet Killers"

American comics artists
Living people
Year of birth missing (living people)
African-American skateboarders
Artist skateboarders
21st-century African-American people